The Alpine Rhine Valley is a glacial alpine valley, formed by the part of the Alpine Rhine between the confluence of the Anterior Rhine and Posterior Rhine at Reichenau and the Alpine Rhine's mouth at Lake Constance. It covers three countries and the full length of the Alpine Rhine is 93.5 km.

From Reichenau, the Alpine Rhine flows east, passing Chur and turning north, before it turns north-east at Landquart, and then roughly north, east of Sargans. From here, the Alpine Rhine forms the border between the canton of St. Gallen of Switzerland on the left, west side, and the Principality of Liechtenstein on the east side. About  further down, the Rhine then meets the Austrian federal state Vorarlberg and finally flows into Lake Constance, south of Lindau (Germany), which is no longer part of the Rhine Valley. The Swiss-Austrian border follows the historical bed of the Rhine, but today the river follows an artificial canal within Austria for the final .

From the point of the Rhine's emergence from Lake Constance, it is known as High Rhine.

Right tributaries of the Alpine Rhine are the Plessur in Chur, the Landquart in the town of the same name, the Ill and Frutz on the Upper Land of the Austrian plain near Feldkirch. The Alpine Rhine has no major left tributaries; creeks joining it from the left are the Oldisbach at Chur, Cosenz at Untervaz, Säge at Tardisbrücke, Tamina at Bad Ragaz, Tobelbach at Buchs, Simml at Gams. Though all left tributaries in the St. Gall Rhine Valley are collected by the Rheintaler Binnenkanal, which flows into Lake of Constance by Alter Rhein, and never meets the Alpine Rhine anymore.

Geography
The highest mountain, Ringelspitz, commences next to Tamins. At , it is the highest peak of the canton of St. Gallen, bordering the valley to its southeast.

Subdivisions
Geographical parts of the Alpine Rhine Valley are:

Upper half:

Chur Rhine Valley, or Grisonian Rhine Valley: The name refers to the town of Chur, or its canton Graubünden, respectively. It starts at Rhäzüns/Bonaduz and ends east of Sargans (SG).

Lower half:

To the north, the Bündner Rheintal crosses into the Rhine valley between Sargans and Lake of Constance, where it largely forms the border between the canton of St. Gallen on the west side and Liechtenstein and Austria on its east side. The valley is simply called the Rhine Valley on either side. The Swiss sometimes also call it the St. Gall Rhine Valley in order to distinguish it from its upper half.
St. Gall Rhine Valley: On its western side, the Rhine Valley is politically further divided into Werdenberg (Wahlkreis) and Rheintal (Wahlkreis), though geographically it is separated by the Hirschensprung near Rüthi (SG).
Eastern side:
On its eastern side, the upper half of the valley is called the Liechtenstein Rhine Valley.
Vorarlberg Rhine Valley: The lower half is also called the Voralberg Rhine Valley, since it belongs to the Austrian federal state Voralberg. It is further divided into an upper and lower part and referred to as the Upper and Lower Lands. The Lower Lands, sometimes also called , stretches from the shores of Lake Constance to the small hill Kummaberg to the south, the upper part lies south of it.

The Rhine

The Alpine Rhine begins in the centre of the Swiss canton of Grisons, and later forms the border between Switzerland to the west and Liechtenstein and later Austria to the east.

It is formed near Tamins-Reichenau by the confluence of the Anterior Rhine and the Posterior Rhine.

The river makes a distinctive turn to the north near Chur. At Landquart it turns north-east and then to the north east of Sargans.

Near Sargans a natural dam, only a few metres high, prevents it from flowing further to the north-west into the open valley, called Seeztal, and then consequently through Lake Walen (and further to Lake Zurich into the river Aare).

The mouth of the Rhine into Lake Constance forms an inland delta. The delta is delimited in the west by the Old Rhine and in the east by a modern canalized section. Most of the delta is a nature reserve and bird sanctuary and has been designated as a Ramsar site since 1982. It includes the Austrian towns of Gaißau, Höchst and Fußach. The natural Rhine originally branched into at least two arms and formed small islands by precipitating sediments.

A regulation of the Rhine was called for, with an upper canal near Diepoldsau and a lower canal at Fußach, in order to counteract the constant flooding and strong sedimentation in the western Rhine Delta. The Dornbirner Ach had to be diverted, too, and it now flows parallel to the canalized Rhine into the lake. Its water has a darker color than the Rhine; the latter's lighter suspended load comes from higher up the mountains. It is expected that the continuous input of sediment into the lake will silt up the lake. This has already happened to the former Lake Tuggenersee.

The cut-off Old Rhine at first formed a swamp landscape. It was made navigable to the Swiss town of Rheineck.

Culture 

The Alpine Rhine Valley is characterised by a very active culture scene. The Bregenzer Festspiele as well as the Kunstmuseum Liechtenstein have great significance and popularity beyond the region. From a regional perspective, there are many platforms, events and projects that enhance the cultural life of the inhabitants and the local actors. In Widnau, the only international artistic gymnastics tournament for male juniors and seniors in Switzerland takes place. It's named Rheintalcup after the Alpine Rhine Valley.

An example of cross-border cooperation in the Alpine Rhine Valley is the cultural axis of the cities Bregenz, St.Gallen, Vaduz and Chur: The Kunsthaus Bregenz, the Kunstmuseum St. Gallen, the Kunstmuseum Liechtenstein and the Bündner Kunstmuseum in Chur have been cooperating since 2001. Visible signs of this cooperation of the four institutions from three countries are the joint presentations on the "ART BODENSEE" each year.

History

Middle Ages

The valley was part of the ancient Roman province of Raetia. The Alemannic people settled the lower Rhine Valley in the early Middle Ages.  Under the Frankish Empire, the Rheintal between Montstein and Hirschensprung was given to the Rhinegraviate (the county of the Rheingau), and its first recorded mention is in 891; the area between Lake Constance and Montstein was a part of the Thurgau.

Rule of the Rhine Valley was fragmented throughout the Middle Ages, with the Holy Roman Emperor, the Bishop of Constance, the Abbot of St Gall and the counts of Bregenz and Werdenberg all claiming various portions of the valley. It was not until 1348 that the Rheintal was united, under the county of Werdenberg-Heiligenberg.
From when the Habsburgs acquired the county of Tyrol in 1363, they gradually began to gain control of the Rhine Valley, gaining the whole valley through a combination of conquest and purchase by 1395.

Vogtei Rheintal

By 1424, the Rhine Valley was largely in the hands of the counts of Toggenburg. After their extinction, Appenzell reconquered the Rheintal with Rheineck in the Old Zürich War in 1445.
Nevertheless, Appenzell was forced to cede the governing protectorship of the Valley to the warring powers—the Abbey and the four cantons of Glarus, Lucerne, Schwyz and Zürich—bringing the bailiwick into the ambit of the Old Swiss Confederation as a Gemeine Herrschaft (condominium).

Early modern history

Swiss Reformation
In 1528, the Protestant Reformation was accepted in the Vogtei Rheintal; whilst Roman Catholic minorities remained, only Altstätten, Widnau, Kriessern and Rüthi had a Catholic majority. Through the defeat of the Catholic hegemony over Switzerland and the end of the lengthy religious disputes that had riven the Confederacy, the 11 August 1712 Peace of Aarau established confessional parity, allowing both faiths to coexist in legal equality—a concept relatively common to the Holy Roman Empire since the Peace of Westphalia in 1648.

Liechtenstein
The Liechtenstein dynasty was able to arrange the purchase of the minuscule Herrschaft ("Lordship") of Schellenberg and county of Vaduz (in 1699 and 1712 respectively) from the Hohenems.
On 23 January 1719, after the lands had been purchased, Charles VI, Holy Roman Emperor, decreed that Vaduz and Schellenberg were united and elevated the newly formed territory to the dignity of Fürstentum (principality) with the name "Liechtenstein" in honour of "[his] true servant, Anton Florian of Liechtenstein". It was on this date that Liechtenstein became a sovereign member state of the Holy Roman Empire. It is a testament to the pure political expediency of the purchases that the Princes of Liechtenstein did not set foot in their new principality for over 120 years.

Napoleonic era

As a result of the Napoleonic Wars, by 1806 the Holy Roman Empire was under the control of French emperor Napoleon I. Napoleon dissolved the empire; this had broad consequences for Liechtenstein: imperial, legal and political mechanisms broke down. The state ceased to owe obligations to any feudal lord beyond its borders.

In 1798, the Vogtei Rheintal unilaterally declared its independence. In the aftermath of the collapse of the Old Swiss Confederation (resulting from it being completely overrun by the French Revolutionary Armies), on 26 March 1798, a Landsgemeinde in Altstätten promulgated a constitution and elected both a magistrate and a council. Within weeks, however, this nascent independence was quashed with the inclusion of the Rheintal into the Helvetic canton of Säntis, with the exception of Rüthi and Lienz, assigned to Linth.

With Napoleon's Act of Mediation on 19 February 1803, the Helvetic Republic and its cantonal boundaries were abolished, with the Rheintal reunited as a district of the canton of St. Gallen, stretching from Staad to Lienz and with its capital alternating monthly between Altstätten and Rheineck.

Modern history
The Bezirk was split in twain in 1831, creating Oberrheintal, with its capital in Altstätten, and Unterrheintal, with its capital alternating between Rheineck and Berneck, St. Gallen. This division persisted until 2003, when a constitutional revision created the modern constituency, with the loss of Thal to the adjacent Wahlkreis of Rorschach.

Gallery

See also

Geography of the Alps
List of valleys of the Alps
International Rhine Regulation Railway

References

 
Valleys of Switzerland
Landforms of Liechtenstein
Austria–Switzerland border
Liechtenstein–Switzerland border
Valleys of Europe
Landforms of the canton of St. Gallen
Valleys of Vorarlberg
Valleys of Austria
Ramsar sites in Austria